Neoboutonia mannii is a species of plant in the family Euphorbiaceae. It is found in Cameroon, Equatorial Guinea, and Nigeria. It is threatened by habitat loss.

References

Aleuritideae
Near threatened plants
Taxonomy articles created by Polbot
Taxa named by George Bentham